Breynia disticha is a plant in the family Phyllanthaceae, first described in 1776. It is native to New Caledonia and Vanuatu in the western Pacific, but naturalized on a wide assortment of other islands around the world (West Indies, São Tomé, Seychelles, Chagos Islands, Bonin Islands, Norfolk Island, Fiji, Line Islands, Society Islands, Hawaii, etc.), as well as in the U.S. state of Florida.

Breynia disticha presumably is pollinated by leafflower moths (Epicephala spp.) in its native range, like other species of plants in the genus Breynia. Leafflower moths have been reared from fruit of this species in New Caledonia.

References

Flora of New Caledonia
Flora of Vanuatu
Plants described in 1863
disticha